Tihomir Bulat (born 28 July 1974) is a Croatian former professional footballer who played as a goalkeeper.

Club career
He spent one season in the Bundesliga with FC St. Pauli during his career and retired at the end of the 2009–10 season.

References

External links
 

1974 births
Living people
Sportspeople from Šibenik
Association football goalkeepers
Croatian footballers
HNK Šibenik players
FC St. Pauli players
HNK Rijeka players
NK Međimurje players
HNK Trogir players
RNK Split players
Croatian Football League players
Bundesliga players
2. Bundesliga players
Croatian expatriate footballers
Expatriate footballers in Germany
Croatian expatriate sportspeople in Germany
HNK Hajduk Split non-playing staff